Anya Beyersdorf is an Australian actress-turned-writer/director born in Armidale, New South Wales. In 2014 she won an AWGIE Award - the Monte Miller Award for her screenplay Paradise at the Australian Writer's Guild Awards. In 2016, she was awarded one of four inaugural Lexus Australia Short Film Fellowships by the Sydney Film Festival. She was also a Nicholl Fellowship in Screenwriting semi-finalist.

Beyersdorf trained in acting and directing in the theatres of Berlin after winning the Marten Bequest Prize for Acting for 2008/2009, working under Bulgarian director Dimiter Gotscheff on the play The Powder Keg at Der Haus der Berliner Festspiele, as well as traveling and studying performance in Poland, Denmark and the USA.

Beyersdorf was one of eight actresses who played the title character Angie in John Winter’s directorial debut feature film, Black & White & Sex. It was her second feature film, after Rats and Cats in 2007.

Beyersdorf has acted in six short films, including playing the role of Emma in Emma and the Barista on ABC TV. She played the lead role in the Australian Film Commission short film Love’s Labour, which was nominated for a Dendy Award in 2007. She also played the role of Tamara in the short film Dugong, which was nominated for an Australian Film Institute Award in 2007.

Filmography
Film

Television

References

External links

Australian film actresses
Living people
Actresses from New South Wales
People from Armidale
Year of birth missing (living people)